Phyllonorycter libanotica is a moth of the family Gracillariidae. It is known from Lebanon.

The larvae probably feed on Quercus species and probably mine the leaves of their host plant.

References

libanotica
Moths of the Middle East
Moths described in 1972